8969 is a 2016 Pakistani thriller film directed by Azeem Sajjad. The film stars Saba Qamar, and introducing new stars namely Hussain Tiwana, Sadaf Hamid, Anam Goher and Ali Jabran Khan in lead roles. It was released on 2 December 2016 under the production banner of A J Media Productions.

Plot
The movie appears to be a murder mystery; along with a serial killer's trivia twist to the story.

Cast

 Saba Qamar as Zara Nawazish
 Hussain Tiwana as Aman
 Sadaf Hamid as Maheen 
 Azeem Sajjad as Shahzaib 
 Anam Malik as Sheela 
 Anam Goher
 Haseeb Khan as Boss
 Sama Shah as Maria 
 Zunaira Maham as Seema 
 Noor-ul-Hassan as DSP Nawazish 
 Oun Sarwar as Detective Oun
 Ali Jabran Khan as Daniyal

Music
The music for the film has been composed by Raheel Fayyaz.

Release
The trailer of 8969 was released in September 2014. The film was set to be released in April 2016 but was pushed to late 2016. The film was released in Pakistan nationwide on 2 December 2016.

See also
List of Pakistani films of 2016

References

External links

2016 films
Pakistani thriller films
2010s Urdu-language films
2016 thriller films
Pakistani mystery films
Pakistani murder films
Urdu-language Pakistani films